KBXL (94.1 FM) is a radio station broadcasting a Christian talk and teaching format. Licensed to Caldwell, Idaho, United States, the station serves the Boise metropolitan area, and is currently owned by Inspirational Family Radio.

History
The station began broadcasting February 22, 1961, and held the call sign KBGN-FM, simulcasting AM 910 KBGN. In 1970, the station's call sign was changed to KBXL. KBXL aired an easy listening format in the 1970s, 1980s, and early 1990s. In October 1991, the station adopted a soft AC format, and was branded "X-94". By 1994, the station had adopted a religious format.

References

External links
KBXL's official website

Radio stations established in 1961
1961 establishments in Idaho
BXL
Caldwell, Idaho